"Say So" is a 2019 song by Doja Cat.

Say So may also refer to:

 Say So (album), by Bent Knee, 2016
 "Say So" (PJ Morton and JoJo song), 2019
 "Say So", a 2021 song by Masked Wolf

See also
 Say Something (disambiguation)
 "Just Say So", a 2010 song by Brian McFadden featuring Kevin Rudolf